Matheson v Northcote College Board of Governors [1975] 2 NZLR 106 is a cited case regarding claims in tort for nuisance.

Background
Matheson's house was next door to Northcote College, and due to its proximity, students from the college frequently left litter, cigarette butts, etc. on his property, as well as stealing fruit from his fruit trees. Matheson sued the college for nuisance.

References

New Zealand tort case law
1975 in New Zealand law